Strength-based practice is a social work practice theory that emphasizes people's self-determination and strengths. It is a philosophy and a way of viewing clients as resourceful and resilient in the face of adversity. It is client-led, with a focus on future outcomes and strengths that people bring to a problem or crisis. When applied beyond the field of social work, strength-based practice is also referred to as the "strength-based approach". This approach can focus on individuals’ strengths as well as wider social and community networks.

History 

Social worker Bertha Reynolds was a proto-theorist for this practice. She criticized the American social work tendency to adopt a psychoanalytic approach (and the corollary dependence on the DSM IV) with clients. It was formally developed by a team from the University of Kansas, including Dennis Saleebey, Charles Rapp, and Ann Weick.

In 1997, Rapp wrote "The Strengths Model", which focused on "amplifying the well part of the patient". The popularity of his approach spread quickly, and, in 1999, Dr. Martin Seligman, the president of the American Psychological Association at the time, made an observation that fueled strength-based practice:The most important thing we learned was that psychology was half-baked. We've baked the part about mental illness, about repair damage. The other side's unbaked, the side of strength, the side of what we're good at.Since then, the strength-based approach has been adapted and applied to many contexts. In the service sector, for example, it has been applied to case management, education, community development, and working with many different groups, such as young people and people with mental illnesses. Beyond social services, in 1995, Marcus Buckingham and Donald Clifton introduced the strengths perspective to the business world.

Key elements 

The strength-based approach is often referred to as a response to more deficit-focused or pathological approaches. For example, Erik Laursen and Laura Nissen noted that in the field of youth justice, the mainstream corrections model focuses on risks and needs and addressing weaknesses. Alternatively, the strength-based approach enhances strengths and builds on characteristics that are already present in individuals.

Although applied differently depending on the population and service, the approach has been characterized as a philosophy or lens through which people are viewed and through which programs and agencies operate. According to Diane Powell and Catherine Batsche, a strength-based philosophy is a critical belief, an all-pervasive attitude that informs a professional's interactions with clients. Ideally, an entire agency will adopt the approach, and, through ongoing training, this attitude-change will occur in all staff, transforming the way they view their work, their colleagues, and, of course, the people and communities they work with.

This strength-based philosophy holds the core belief that all individuals have strengths and resources. The focus of the practice is on a person's skills, interests, and support systems. Its simple premise is to identify what is going well, how to do more of it, and how to build on it.

Outcomes 

Evaluation of the effectiveness of the strength-based approach is limited; however, some studies have shown that working with individuals and communities through a strength lens improves individual outcomes, such as quality of life, employment, and health. On a more societal level, a strength-based approach promotes positive views of individuals and takes focus away from blame or judgement. This alternative view may contribute to de-stigmatization of certain groups and may increase positive political attention and social support. Overall, there is a need for more research and further evaluations of the strength-based approach.

References

Social work